Acoenonia is a genus of midges in the family Cecidomyiidae. The six described species are found in the holarctic region. The genus was first described by Arthur Earl Pritchard in 1947.

Species
Acoenonia baltica Jaschhof, 2017
Acoenonia europaea Mamaev, 1964
Acoenonia nana Meyer & Spungis, 1994
Acoenonia perissa Pritchard, 1947
Acoenonia sidorenkoi Fedotova, 2004
Acoenonia ulleviensis Jaschhof, 2017

References

Cecidomyiidae genera

Insects described in 1947
Taxa named by Arthur Earl Pritchard